Herbert Thomas "Tom" Reiner Jr. (September 21, 1916 – December 28, 1999) was an American career diplomat who, while on a posting in India from 1947 to 1949, played a key role in capturing Mahatma Gandhi's assassin, Nathuram Godse.  Reiner was among those present when Godse fatally shot Gandhi at an evening prayer meeting in New Delhi on January 30, 1948.  Moments after the shooting, while the attending crowd was still in shock, Reiner rushed forward, grasping Godse by the shoulders, and restraining him until military and police personnel took him away.  In the days following,  Reiner's action was reported in newspapers around the world.

Biography
Reiner was born in Brattleboro, Vermont, and raised in Lancaster, Massachusetts, attending Leominster High School in Leominster, Massachusetts, and graduating in 1933.  He received his bachelor's degree from Bates College, and a master's from Clark University.  He served in the US Navy in World War II as a Sino-American Cooperative Organization (SACO) economic intelligence assistant, and was discharged in 1946 as a Lieutenant Commander.  He arrived in newly independent India in 1947 as a disbursing and financial officer for the US State Department, in the US Embassy in New Delhi, with the rank of vice-consul.  Reiner moved to Korea in June 1949, and during the Korean War, served as a consul general during the Battle of the Pusan Perimeter; in later years, he served as consul general in Freetown, Sierra Leone, and Johannesburg, South Africa.  He ended his diplomatic career in Canberra, Australia, and moved to Cape Cod in 1976. Reiner died on December 28, 1999, at his home in Cotuit, Massachusetts.

Capture of Nathuram Godse

In early September 1947, Gandhi had moved to Delhi in order to help stem the rioting there, and in the neighboring province of East Punjab.  The rioting had come in the wake of the partition of the British Indian empire, which had accompanied the creation of the newly independent dominions of India and Pakistan, and involved large, chaotic, transfers of the population between them.

Reiner began his diplomatic career in late September 1947, arriving some time thereafter as disbursing officer at the new American embassy in the Diplomatic Enclave in New Delhi.  Soon after arrival, Reiner had written to his parents, expressing a wish to see Gandhi at one of his evening multi-faith prayer meetings.  Gandhi had initially been staying at the Hindu Sant Balmiki Temple, near Gole Market in the northern regions of New Delhi, and holding his prayer meetings there, but as the temple was requisitioned for sheltering refugees of the partition, he moved to Birla House, a large mansion on what was then Albuquerque Road in south-central New Delhi, not far from Diplomatic Enclave.  Gandhi was living in two unpretentious rooms in the left wing of Birla House, and conducting the prayer meetings on a raised lawn behind the mansion.

On January 30, 1948, Reiner reached Birla House after work, arriving fifteen minutes before the scheduled start of the prayer meeting at 5 p.m., and finding himself in a relatively small crowd.  Although there were some armed guards present, Reiner felt that the security measures were inadequate, especially in view of an attempted bomb explosion at the same location ten days before.   By the time Gandhi and his small party reached the garden area a few minutes after five, the crowd had swelled to several hundred, which Reiner described as comprising "schoolboys, girls, sweepers, members of the armed services, businessmen, sadhus, holymen, and even vendors displaying pictures of 'Bapu'".  At first, Reiner had been at some distance from the path leading to the dais, but he moved forward, explaining later, "An impulse to see more, and at a closer range, of this Indian leader impelled me to move away from the group in which I had been standing to the edge of the terrace steps".

As Gandhi was walking briskly up the steps leading to the lawn, an unidentified man in the crowd spoke up, somewhat insolently in Reiner's recollection, "Gandhiji, you are late". Gandhi slowed down his pace, turned toward the man, and gave him an annoyed look, passing directly in front of Reiner at that moment.  But no sooner had Gandhi reached the top of the steps than another man, a stocky Indian man, in his 30s, and dressed in khaki clothes, stepped out from the crowd and into Gandhi's path.  He soon fired several shots up close, at once felling Gandhi.  The BBC correspondent Robert Stimson described what happened next in a radio report filed that night: "For a few seconds no one could believe what had happened; every one seemed dazed and numb. And then a young American who had come for prayers rushed forward and seized the shoulders of the man in the khaki coat. That broke the spell. ... Half a dozen people stooped to lift Gandhi. Others hurled themselves upon the attacker. ... He was overpowered and taken away".  Others, as well, described how the crowd seemed paralyzed until Reiner's action.

Robert Trumbull of The New York Times, who was an eyewitness, described Reiner's action in a front-page story on January 31, 1948, "The assassin was seized by Tom Reiner of Lancaster, Mass., a vice consul attached to the American Embassy and a recent arrival in India. ... Mr. Reiner grasped the assailant by the shoulders and shoved him toward several police guards. Only then did the crowd begin to grasp what had happened and a forest of fists belabored the assassin ..." Reiner too had noticed a man in khaki step into the path leading to the dais, but his further view was occluded by a party of associates following Gandhi.  He soon heard sounds, though, which in his words were "not loud, not ringing, and not unlike the reports of damp firecrackers ..."  and which for a moment made him wonder if some sort of celebration was not underway.

After Gandhi had fallen, Reiner thought Godse himself looked a little stunned at how easily he had carried out his plan.  Reiner reported, "(Godse) stood nearly motionless with a small beretta dangling in his right hand and to my knowledge made no attempt to escape or to take his own fire.  ... Moving toward Godse I extended my right arm in an attempt to seize his gun but in doing so grasped his right shoulder in a manner that spun him into the hands of Royal Indian Air Force men, also spectators, who disarmed him. I then fastened a firm grasp on his neck and shoulders until other military and police took him into custody".  Reiner then stepped away, in some relief, for, on account of his proximity to Godse, he had been fearing receiving a blow or even a bullet from the frenzied crowd.

Elsewhere, Reiner recalled, "People were standing as though paralyzed. I moved around them, grasped his shoulder and spun him around, then took a firmer grip on his shoulders".  In one account of Gandhi's assassination, Reiner is said to have "seized and pummeled" Godse. In another account, he is said to have wished to remain anonymous.  Authors N. H. Pronko and J. W. Bowles, in Empirical Foundations of Psychology, consider Reiner's actions as having constituted a critical "new stimulus" that paved the way from a "no response period" of the crowd—which had begun in the wake of the "disturbing stimulus" of the shooting—to "coordinated and adjustmental" behaviors.

Godse was put on trial in the summer of 1948; he was sentenced to death and hanged in November 1949.  Reiner left India in June 1949, moving briefly to Hungary, where he served as Assistant Attaché with the American Legation in Budapest, and later the same year to a new diplomatic service appointment in South Korea.

References

Notes

Citations

Works cited

1916 births
1999 deaths
American consuls
Assassination of Mahatma Gandhi
Bates College alumni
Clark University alumni
American diplomats
People from Lancaster, Massachusetts
People from Brattleboro, Vermont
United States Navy officers
20th-century American diplomats